Cisséla (or Sissélà) is a town and sub-prefecture in the Kouroussa Prefecture, Kankan Region, of eastern-central Guinea. As of 2014 it had a population of 41,562 people.

Transport 

It has a railway station on the main line of Guinean Railways.

References 

Sub-prefectures of the Kankan Region